Condottieri is a 1937 Italian historical drama film directed by Luis Trenker and starring Trenker, Loris Gizzi and Laura Nucci. It portrays the life of Giovanni de' Medici, a celebrated condottiere of the sixteenth century. A separate German-language version was also made.

The film received 9.6 million lire of funding from the Italian government, as part as a major drive by the Fascist authorities to develop the Italian film industry (which also involved the construction of the large Cinecittà complex in Rome). Along with Scipio Africanus, the film was an attempt to harness history to support the Fascist regime's current policies. Condottieri drew parallels between the dictator Benito Mussolini and the historical figure of de' Medici, portraying both as unifying Italy. The film's elaborate sets were designed by Virgilio Marchi and Erich Grave, while Herbert Ploberger produced the costumes.

Cast
Luis Trenker as Giovanni de' Medici
Loris Gizzi as Malatesta
Laura Nucci as Tullia delle Grazie		
 as Maria Salviati
 as Caterina Sforza
Mario Ferrari as Cesare Borgia
Angelo Ferrari		
Giulio Cirino as Rüschli
Sandro Dani as D'Argentière	
Tito Gobbi as Nino
Augusto Marcacci as Daniello
Nino Marchetti as Corrado
 as Pedro
Ernesto Nannicini
Umberto Sacripante as Sanzio
Carlo Tamberlani as Duke of Urbino
Gino Viotti as Pope
Giuseppe Addobbati as Duke of Imola
Friedl Trenker as Giovanni 
Oreste Bilancia
Alberto Emmerich
Carlo Fontana
Tullio Galvani
Luis Gerold as Barbo
Alberto Minoprio
Carlo Simoneschi
Virgilio Botti
Mara Danieli
Claudio Ermelli
Carlo Duse

See also
The Violent Patriot (1956)
The Profession of Arms (2001)

References

External links

1930s action war films
1930s historical films
Italian action films
Italian war films
Italian historical films
Films of Nazi Germany
German black-and-white films
1930s Italian-language films
Films directed by Luis Trenker
Films set in the 16th century
Italian multilingual films
Italian black-and-white films
Cultural depictions of Cesare Borgia
Cultural depictions of Caterina Sforza
1937 multilingual films
Fascist propaganda
1930s Italian films